is a former Japanese football player.

Playing career
Shiba was born in Osaka Prefecture on April 18, 1974. After graduating from Fukuoka University, he joined Japan Football League club Oita Trinity in 1997. He played as center back in 2 seasons. In 1999, he moved to newly was promoted to J2 League club, Albirex Niigata. He became a regular player as center back. However his opportunity to play decreased from 2001. In 2003, he moved to Japanese Regional Leagues club Thespa Kusatsu. He retired end of 2003 season.

Club statistics

References

External links

1974 births
Living people
Fukuoka University alumni
Association football people from Osaka Prefecture
Japanese footballers
J2 League players
Japan Football League (1992–1998) players
Oita Trinita players
Albirex Niigata players
Thespakusatsu Gunma players
Association football defenders